The Soho Grand Hotel is a hotel located at 310 West Broadway between Grand and Canal Streets in the SoHo neighborhood of Lower Manhattan, New York City at the former location of Church of St. Alphonsus Liguori. It has 353 guest rooms, including ten suites and two penthouses. With the Roxy Hotel (formerly the Tribeca Grand Hotel), they make up GrandLife Hotels and are owned and operated by Leonard N. Stern of Hartz Mountain Industries.

The Soho Grand Hotel opened on August 4, 1996 news of the build initiated significant opposition from local residents; eight prior attempts to build a hotel there in the preceding decade had failed

Design
The Soho Grand was designed by David Helpern of Helpern Architects. The interiors are designed by William Sofield of Studio Sofield. The architecture and design incorporate elements including bottle glass and cast iron molding, both of which are prominent in neighborhood buildings from SoHo industrial history.

Renovations have continued within the hotel since its opening; in 2004, the hotel introduced two penthouse loft suites, winners of the Interior Design Gold Key award.

Soho Grand's guestrooms and Suites’ design direction take their cue from the public spaces. In 2010, the hotel unveiled ten suites designed by William Sofield that feature wall coverings designed by New Yorker illustrator, Saul Steinberg.

In popular culture
The Soho Grand has been represented in a variety of feature films, television shows, and online videos including:
The Oprah Winfrey "Best of" Show
The Sopranos
Sex and the City
Donna Karan viral video starring Christina Ricci
Made, a film by Jon Favreau.

Recent events
In fall 2013, a hotel employee started several fires because he allegedly wanted to lighten his workload by making the hotel less popular.

References

External links

 Official website

Hotel buildings completed in 1996
Hotels in Manhattan
Hotels established in 1996
SoHo, Manhattan